D-Boys (stylized as D-BOYS) is a young male actors group affiliated with Watanabe Entertainment. The D in the group's name stands for "Drama" (acting work), "Dream", "Debut", "Discovery" and "Development" (growth and advancement).

Although the D-Boys are promoted as a group and members occasionally work together on the same projects, each actor develops his career independently from his fellow members in their own television, cinema and theatre projects. New D-Boys members are regularly selected through public audition events with interactive participation of fan club members.

Members

Current members

Former members

D2 members
In 2009, D2 was formed as D-Boys' younger brother group. In October 2013, D2 joined D-Boys to become its sub-group.
Current members
 Yukito Nishii
 Ryo Mitsuya
 Syo Jinnai
 Atsushi Arai
 Ryosuke Ikeoka
 Yuki Yamada
 Takahisa Maeyama
 Shotaro Okubo
 Jun Shison
Former members
 
 Toru Kamitsuru
 Kenki Yamaguchi
 Yoichiro Omi
 Shintaro Akutsu
 Shion Tsuchiya
 Takuya Negishi
 Atsushi Shiramata

Group projects
In addition to their individual careers, the D-Boys are also involved in collective projects, as part of the group promotion work.

DD-Boys
DD-Boys was a drama-documentary variety series, featuring the D-Boys members as themselves. Each episode had a short staged section following the plot of the members living in the fictional D-House and seeking ways to raise money for rent, followed by a documentary section showing the members undertaking tasks or challenges to raise that money. Some tasks were inspired by the actor's own personality -e.g., a member who was known to enjoy singing or dancing would have a task related to that hobby, etc. The show was 23 episodes long and aired from 10 April 2006 to 25 September 2006 on TV Asahi.

Stage works

Fan club events
The D-Boys hold special events where fan club members have the opportunity to meet the actors in person and interact with them in camp activities and games such as cook-offs, tug-of-war, etc., in which the members are split into teams, leading groups of fans to compete with each other.

 Official Fan club Day Camp Bus Tour (November 13, 2005)
 Official Fan club Limited Bus Tour (August 25 to August 27, 2006)
 Official Fan club 3rd Anniversary Bus Tour (September 6 to 8, 2007)

Live tours
During the summer of 2009, 19 D-Boys members, including Yu Shirota participated in performances for fans at Akiba Plaza called "Kotoshi no Natsu wa Mainichi Dokoka de D-Boys Uki-uki Yatta Hohohoy" or for short, Natsu Doko. There were 49 performances in total of dances, songs and skits. New D-Boys member, Yusuke Yamada, was introduced to fans during these performances. Three CD+DVD sets featuring different recorded audio theater by separate groups of D-Boys members and footage of Natsu Doko were released on December 16, 2009.

Due to the success and demand of Natsu Doko, a live tour called Fuyu Doko 2009 was held in the winter of 2009 with 19 D-Boys members and Yu Shirota visiting major cities in Japan to promote the Natsu Doko 2009 CD+DVD release. It was the first live tour around the nation for the group.

Radio
 Marvelous Radio Vibration (May 5, 2005 - April 1, 2006) - weekly radio show hosted by Yu Shirota, Kotaro Yanagi and Yukki.
 D-Radio Boys (October 2007/present) - weekly radio show hosted by Masato Wada and Shunji Igarashi, featuring guest D-Boys members.

Other
 43rd Secret New Years' Performance Tournament "Young Man Colosseum" (January 1, 2006) - television guest appearance, performed by Masaki Kaji and Hiroki Suzuki.
 44th Secret New Years' Performance Tournament "Chinese Lion Dance" (January 1, 2007) - television guest appearance, performed by Yuya Endo, Masaki Kaji, Hiroki Suzuki, Masato Wada and Yuma Minakawa.
 45th Secret New Years' Performance Tournament "Ikemen Jumpers" (January 1, 2008) - television guest appearance, performed by Masaki Kaji, Kouhei Kumai, Koji Seto, and Shingo Nakagawa.
 45th Secret New Years' Performance Tournament "Kakushi Gei Dancing Ikemen" (Fuji TV - January 1, 2009) - television guest appearance, performed by Tomo Yanagishita, Endo Yuya, Masaki Kaji, Makita Tetsuya, Taito Hashimoto, and Ryuki Takahashi.

Media
D-Boys members have released merchandise in the form of photobooks, DVDs and CDs individually, or in relation to a work project (e.g. character image CDs/photobooks). As a group, they have released a calendar featuring all D-Boys members and the following items:

Official photobooks

DVD series
{| class="wikitable"
|- 
! Series
! Title
! DVD info
! Members
! Release date
|-
| rowspan="10"| D-Boys Boy Friend Series
| No Fiction
| Volume 1
| Shunji Igarashi
| June 24, 2009
|-
| Self-Discovery
| Volume 2
| Yuichi Nakamura
| August 21, 2009
|-
| Peacemaker
| Volume 3
| Hiroki Suzuki
| September 18, 2009
|-
| Sugao
| Volume 4
| Hirofumi Araki
| October 23, 2009
|-
| Tomorrow
| Volume 5
| Tomo Yanagishita
| November 26, 2009
|-
| Yu Channel
| Volume 6
| Yu Shirota
| December 23, 2009
|-
| 7 Heroes
| Volume 7
|
 Yuichi Nakamura
 Shunji Igarashi
 Koji Seto
 Hiroki Suzuki
 Hirofumi Araki
 Masahiro Usui
 Masashi Mikami
| February 24, 2010
|-
| Super Rookie
| Volume 8
| Ryuki Takahashi
| March 25, 2010
|-
| Tight Rizm
| Volume 9
| Taito Hashimoto
| April 21, 2010
|-
| Set Out'
| Volume 10
| Koji Seto
| May 26, 2010
|-
| rowspan="3"| Natsu Doko 2009
| Natsu Doko 2009 Kaze - Team Wind version
| DVD for D-Boys Natsu Doko 2009| All members with Yu Shirota
| December 16, 2009
|-
| Natsu Doko 2009 Yama - Team Mountain version
| DVD for D-Boys Natsu Doko 2009| All members with Yu Shirota
| December 16, 2009
|-
| Natsu Doko 2009 Kawa - Team River version
| DVD for D-Boys Natsu Doko 2009| All members with Yu Shirota
| December 16, 2009
|-
| rowspan="2"| Haru Doko 2010
| Haru Doko 2010: Momo| DVD for D-Boys Haru Doko 2010| Momo members
| July 14, 2010
|-
| Haru Doko 2010: Sakura| DVD for D-Boys Haru Doko 2010| Sakura members
| July 14, 2010
|}

Discography
The D-Boys have released on December 16, 2009, three CD+DVD sets featuring different recorded audio theater by separate groups of D-Boys members on CD and footage of Natsu Doko on DVD. Natsu Doko 2009'' debuted on the Oricon Charts in 11th.

References

External links
  
 Watanabe Entertainment official website 
 Interview with U (Shirota Yu) 
  
  

Japanese entertainers
Japanese male actors
Watanabe Entertainment
Japanese boy bands